The fraternal hill rat (Bunomys fratrorum) is a species of rodent in the family Muridae.
It is found only in northeastern Sulawesi, Indonesia.
Its natural habitat is tropical dry forest.
It is threatened by habitat loss.

References

Bunomys
Mammals described in 1896
Rodents of Indonesia
Endemic fauna of Indonesia
Rodents of Sulawesi
Taxa named by Oldfield Thomas
Taxonomy articles created by Polbot